Jean Borotra defeated Howard Kinsey 8–6, 6–1, 6–3 in the final to win the gentlemen's singles tennis title at the 1926 Wimbledon Championships. René Lacoste was the defending champion, but withdrew before his first round match.

Draw

Finals

Top half

Section 1

Section 2

Section 3

Section 4

Bottom half

Section 5

Section 6

Section 7

Section 8

References

External links

Men's Singles
Wimbledon Championship by year – Men's singles